Hakatere Conservation Park is a protected area between the Rakaia River and the Rangitata River in the Ashburton District (Mid Canterbury) of New Zealand. The park was established in 2007. It covers 60,000 hectares of rugged mountains and mountain basins, tussocklands and beech forest. It includes the Ashburton Lakes, such as Lake Heron and Lake Clearwater, popular tramping area Mount Somers / Te Kiekie, and Mount Hutt skifield. The closest town is Mount Somers.

See also
Conservation parks of New Zealand

References

Protected areas of Canterbury, New Zealand
Parks in Canterbury, New Zealand
Conservation parks of New Zealand